Kfar Etzion (lit. Etzion Village) is an Israeli settlement in the West Bank, organized as a religious kibbutz located in the Judean Hills between Jerusalem and Hebron in the southern West Bank, established in 1927, depopulated in 1948 and re-established in 1967. It is located 4.7 km east of the Green Line and falls under the jurisdiction of Gush Etzion Regional Council.

The majority of the international community considers Israeli settlements in the West Bank illegal under international law, but the Israeli government disputes this.

History

Migdal Eder
In January 1927, the Zikhron David society, a group of Orthodox Jews from the Mea Shearim neighborhood of Jerusalem, established a small farming community, Migdal Eder, on land near to the present site of Kfar Etzion. The name was taken from a verse in the Bible, Genesis 35:21, which referenced a tower by the same name. A group of 15 families, including 12 Yemenite families, settled on the land. The farming outcomes were very disappointing and pleas for help from the Zionist Executive and the Palestine Jewish Colonization Association were rejected. After one year, only 7 families remained. At the onset of the 1929 Palestine riots, the remaining settlers fled and local Arabs destroyed the buildings. Residents of the neighboring Palestinian village of Beit Ummar sheltered the farmers, but they could not return to their land.

El haHar

The El haHar ("to the mountain") settlement company was founded by Shmuel Zvi Holzmann in 1933. Holzmann bought land, mostly from Migdal Eder, and leased land from a nearby Russian convent. The intention was to found three settlements: Kfar Etzion, Pri-Amal and Ya'ar Etzion. The name "Etzion" was a play on Holzmann's own name, as "Holz" means "wood" in German and Yiddish, while "etz" means "wood" in Hebrew. However workers preparing the site left in 1936 due to the beginning of the Arab Revolt. Much of the land was purchased by the Jewish National Fund to keep it in Jewish hands.

Old Kfar Etzion

In the early 1940s, additional land in the area was purchased by the Jewish National Fund, including some from a Benedictine monastery and some from Arabs (despite the 1939 White Paper's ban on land sales to Jews in the area). The site of Kfar Etzion was settled in 1943 by Kvutzat Avraham of the religious Hapoel HaMizrachi movement. During the next four years, three additional kibbutzim were founded in the area, creating what became known as the Etzion bloc. All of them were destroyed in the 1948 Arab-Israeli War, and the entire area came under Jordanian rule.

The kibbutzim held off the attacks for ten days until Kfar Etzion fell on 14 May 1948. In the fighting, 157 Jewish defenders died, including a number who were killed after surrendering. The other three kibbutzim surrendered. The inhabitants there were taken as prisoners of war and released nine months later.

New Kfar Etzion settlement
In 1967 Israel occupied the West Bank in the Six-Day War. The Israeli cabinet decided to re-establish the settlement of Kfar Etzion despite receiving legal advice that establishing such settlements in occupied territory would be illegal under the Fourth Geneva Convention. A key figure identified with Kfar Etzion's reestablishment after 1967 is Hanan Porat, who lived on the kibbutz as a child prior to its destruction in 1948.

Another figure involved in Kfar Etzion's resettlement is Elyashiv Knohl, a rabbi of the community whose father fought in the  1948 Arab–Israeli War  and was captured during the war by the Jordanians. According to Knohl, Kfar Etzion's original settlers were socialists, and members of the kibbutz continue to channel their incomes to a joint account. Today Kfar Etzion houses a museum and archive documenting the history of Gush Etzion.

In the 2013 Middle East cold snap a meter of snow fell on the Kfar Etzion area.

Economy 
Residents of Kfar Etzion earn their livelihood growing cherries, flowers, olives, almonds, and grapes. Some raise chickens, and others work in Jerusalem. As of 2012 there is a large clothing store on the settlement.

See also 
Lone Tree Brewery

References

Further reading
Yossi Katz, Between Jerusalem and Hebron: Jewish Settlement in the Pre-State Period

External links
Official website 
Peace Now fact sheet

Kibbutzim
Religious Kibbutz Movement
Populated places established in 1927
Populated places established in 1934
Populated places established in 1943
Populated places established in 1967
Religious Israeli settlements
Villages depopulated during the Arab–Israeli conflict
Jewish villages depopulated during the 1948 Arab–Israeli War
Gush Etzion Regional Council
Yemeni-Jewish culture in Israel
1927 establishments in Mandatory Palestine
1934 establishments in Mandatory Palestine
1943 establishments in Mandatory Palestine
1967 establishments in the Israeli Military Governorate
Israeli settlements in the West Bank
1948 disestablishments in the West Bank Governorate